Rodniki (lit. springs) is a town and the administrative center of Rodnikovsky District in Ivanovo Oblast, Russia, located on the Yuksha River,  northeast of Ivanovo, the administrative center of the oblast. Population:

History
It has been known since 1606 and was granted town status in 1918.

Administrative and municipal status
Within the framework of administrative divisions, Rodniki serves as the administrative center of Rodnikovsky District, to which it is directly subordinated. Prior to the adoption of the Law #145-OZ On the Administrative-Territorial Division of Ivanovo Oblast in December 2010, it used to be incorporated separately as an administrative unit with the status equal to that of the districts.

As a municipal division, the town of Rodniki is incorporated within Rodnikovsky Municipal District as Rodnikovskoye Urban Settlement.

Miscellaneous

References

Notes

Sources

Cities and towns in Ivanovo Oblast
Yuryevetsky Uyezd